The Tufts University School of Medicine is the medical school of Tufts University, a private research university in Massachusetts. It was established in 1893 and is located on the university's health sciences campus in downtown Boston. It has clinical affiliations with numerous doctors and researchers in the United States and around the world, as well as with its affiliated hospitals in both Massachusetts (including Tufts Medical Center, St. Elizabeth's Medical Center, Lahey Hospital and Medical Center and Baystate Medical Center), and Maine (Maine Medical Center).

History
The School of Medicine was established by vote of the Trustees of Tufts College on April 22, 1893. It was formed by the secession of seven faculty from the College of Physicians and Surgeons in Boston, a school which was formed in 1880. These "original seven" faculty members successfully lobbied to establish a medical school under the auspices of Tufts College. The new school, which was designated the Medical School of Tufts College, opened its doors in October 1893 with eighty students. The school was, from the very beginning, coeducational, and of the twenty-two students who graduated that first year, eight were women. When the trustees changed the name of the institution from "Tufts College" to "Tufts University" in 1954, the medical school became the "Tufts University School of Medicine."

The Tufts Medical Center, the principal teaching hospital of TUSM, came into existence in 1930 through the alliance of the Boston Dispensary, the Boston Floating Hospital for Children, and the Trustees of Tufts College. The New England Medical Center (NEMC) was established as a non-profit corporation to coordinate the administrative activities of its constituent organizations. 

In 1946, the Pratt Diagnostic Clinic, an extension of the Boston Dispensary established in 1938, joined NEMC. In 1950, when the Medical School and Dental School relocated to Harrison Avenue, the NEMC became known as the New England Medical Center Hospital. The name of the institution changed to the Tufts New England Medical Center (T-NEMC) in 1968, to New England Medical Center in the 1980s, back to T-NEMC in 2002, and ultimately to the Tufts Medical Center in 2008. Over the years, the governing boards of Tufts University and the medical center negotiated a series of affiliation agreements. Tufts University and Tufts Medical Center are separate corporate entities. However, the president and several other senior officers of Tufts University are ex officio members of the board of directors of the Medical Center.

Deans 
 Stephen Rushmore, MD, ScD: 1922-1927
 A. Warren Stearns, MD: 1927–1945
 Dwight O'Hara, MD: 1945–1952
 Joseph M. Hayman, MD: 1952–1966
 William F. Maloney, 1966–1973
 Lauro Cavazos, PhD: Acting Dean 1973–1975, Dean 1975–1980
 Marray R. Blair Jr. (interim) 1980
 Robert I. Levy, 1981
 Henry H. Banks, MD: 1983–1990
 Morton A. Madoff, MD, MPH: 1992–1995
 John T. Harrington, MD: Dean ad interim 1995–1996, Dean 1996–2002
 Michael Rosenblatt, MD: 2003–2009
 Harris Berman, MD: Dean ad interim 2009–2011, Dean 2011–2019
 Peter Bates, MD: Dean ad interim: 2020–2021
 Helen Boucher, MD: Dean ad interim: 2021–2022, Dean 2022-present

Organization and degree programs
The Tufts University School of Medicine (TUSM), established in 1893, is under the supervision of a dean, appointed by the president and the provost, with the approval of the Trustees of Tufts College (the university's governing board). The dean is responsible for all aspects of the school's operations, including medical education, admissions, faculty appointments, clinical relationships, and various affiliated research centers and institutes.

The TUSM faculty is divided into seven basic science departments and eighteen clinical science departments. The clinical faculty have primary staff appointments at the Tufts Medical Center, Baystate Hospital, the VA Boston Medical Healthcare System, and Faulkner Hospital, and seven other teaching hospitals in Massachusetts. The basic science faculty, on the other hand, are full-time members of the Tufts University faculty.

TUSM offers a four year curriculum leading to the degree of doctor of medicine as well as several combined degree programs: MD/MPH, MD/PhD, the MD/MS in engineering, a joint program with the School of Engineering, an MD/MBA in Health Management in collaboration with Brandeis University, and an MD/MALD with the Fletcher School of Law and Diplomacy. A final unconventional degree program is the early acceptance joint BA/MD program offered exclusively to undergraduates at Tufts University, College of the Holy Cross, Boston College, Brandeis University, and Northeastern. The School of Medicine also offers three free–standing programs: a master of public health degree offered in collaboration with the School of Arts and Sciences and the Gerald J. and Dorothy R. Friedman School of Nutrition Science and Policy and has four tracks that include: a Bachelors/MPH offered with the School of Arts and Sciences, a JD/MPH offered in collaboration with Northeastern University School of Law, an MS in Nutrition/MPH offered with the Friedman School of Nutrition Science and Policy, and DVM/MPH offered with the School of Veterinary Medicine. The school also offers as a Master of Science in health communication and a Master of Science in pain research, education and policy in collaboration with the Health Institute/Tufts Medical Center. 

In fall 2004, TUSM enrolled approximately 700 full-time students in first professional degree programs (MD, MD/MPH, MD/PhD, MD/MBA, MD/MALD, and MD/MS) and approximately 40 full-time students in graduate degree programs (MS and MPH). 

In fall 2007, TUSM began a new masters program (MBS) as part of the Public Health and Professional Degree program, offering a Masters of Science in Biomedical Sciences, with approximately 120 full-time students annually.

Facilities
The Tufts University School of Medicine and the Graduate School of Biomedical Sciences are located in five adjoining research buildings along Boston's Harrison Avenue and a teaching and administrative building, the Center for Medical Education. The newest addition is the $65 million, nine story, Jaharis Family Center for Biomedical and Nutrition Sciences. The Jaharis Family Center provides research laboratories and offices for many faculty members and their students, postdoctoral fellows and technical staff. The building also includes offices and laboratory facilities for the Gerald J. and Dorothy R. Friedman School of Nutrition Science and Policy and the Department of Family and Community Medicine in TUSM. TUSM and the Biomedical School are adjacent to the Tufts Medical Center, the School of Dental Medicine, and Gerald J. and Dorothy R. Friedman School of Nutrition Science and Policy, and across the street from the Jean Meyer USDA Human Nutrition Research Center on Aging.

Affiliate teaching hospitals 
The Tufts University School of Medicine does not directly own or operate any hospitals and instead relies on affiliate hospitals for clinical education and patient care. While medical students can spend time at any of the affiliate centers, they primarily complete their clinical experiences at Tufts Medical Center.

Academics
Tufts University is ranked #81 in clinical and health studies by Times Higher Education (THE), #201-300 by Academic Ranking of World Universities (ARWU), and #56 in medical research by US News.

Notable people
Harold Bornstein, Gastroenterologist, former personal physician to Donald Trump
Helen Boucher, Director of the Tufts Center for Integrated Management of Antimicrobial Resistance
Lauro Cavazos, Dean of Tufts University School of Medicine (1975-1980), and United States Secretary of Education (1988-1990)
Anna Quincy Churchill, professor of anatomy from 1923 to 1954
Jane F. Desforges, hematologist and professor of medicine
Louise Eisenhardt, neuropathologist, first female president of the American Association of Neurological Surgeons, famous for her work with Harvey Cushing
Michael Greger, physician, author, and professional speaker on public health issues, best known for his advocacy of a whole-food, plant-based diet
Sara Murray Jordan, gastroenterologist, first female present of the American Gastroenterological Association
John S. Kauer, professor emeritus
Joseph Barnett Kirsner, gastroenterologist, academic and pioneer in the field of digestive system disorders
George D. LeMaitre, vascular surgeon, author, and surgical device inventor
Roderick MacKinnon, 2003 Nobel Prize winner for his work on ion channels, Professor of Molecular Neurobiology and Biophysics at Rockefeller University
Eric Rubin, current editor-in-chief of The New England Journal of Medicine, microbiologist and infectious disease specialist, adjunct professor at Harvard T.H. Chan School of Public Health
John Q. Trojanowski, neurological researcher and professor specializing in neurodegenerative disease
Gerhard Schmidt, biochemist
Josefa Zaratt, first African-American woman to graduate from Tufts Medical School

References

External links

Medical schools in Massachusetts
Tufts University
Universities and colleges in Boston
Educational institutions established in 1893
1893 establishments in Massachusetts